Million Dollar Extreme (MDE) is an American sketch comedy troupe. The group consists of Sam Hyde, Nick Rochefort, and Charls Carroll. The group remains largely inactive since the cancellation of their show World Peace in 2016. They are known for their online videos, anti-comedy, and public pranks mainly uploaded on their several related YouTube channels. They are also controversial for their support from alt-right and white supremacist fans, and Sam Hyde's connections to the alt-right. The group's first YouTube channel was permanently banned in 2018 for violating the website's community guidelines.

YouTube channel

Million Dollar Extreme started out making sketch comedy videos on their YouTube channel, which David Weigel described as "absurdist" and "transgressive", often centering around themes mocking political correctness. Sam Hyde's monologues, recorded on his iPhone, were also a staple for video content on the channel.

Hyde also performed numerous public pranks that he uploaded to the MDE YouTube channel. Most notably in 2013, Hyde delivered a fake TEDx talk titled "2070 Paradigm Shift" at Drexel University.

The troupe has run into various issues with online terms of service violations due to their content and fanbase. On May 4, 2018, the MDE channel was permanently removed from YouTube for a violation of the site's community guidelines. On September 10, 2018, the group's subreddit on Reddit was permanently removed for violations of their policy regarding violent content.

World Peace

On May 7, 2015, it was announced that MDE were slated to have their own live action 15-minute sketch show on the cable network Adult Swim. It was to be set in a post-apocalyptic nightmare world that satirizes the current political climate. Titled Million Dollar Extreme Presents: World Peace, the series premiered on August 5, 2016. Three weeks later, after World Peace was subject to internal controversy at Adult Swim due to Sam Hyde's connections to the alt-right, it was announced that the show would not be renewed for a second season.

Critical reception
Christian Williams of The A.V. Club describes them: "Some videos borrow Wonder Showzens toolkit, wielding subliminal blips and eye-straining text in service of subversive ends. Some make use of the Tim And Eric Awesome Show, Great Job! aesthetic, and some are surprisingly slick, with excellent, eardrum-shredding music courtesy of talented mystery-men like Orangy and Vaervaf." In the view of Philly Mag's Andrew Thompson: "The mission of Million Dollar Extreme has always seemed a spin on afflicting the comfortable, except its targets usually aren’t the comfortably powerful. To the extent that satire exists in MDEs comedy, it feels like more of rationalization than a reason for the shock itself."

References

American performance artists
American sketch comedians
American stand-up comedians
Black comedy
Internet trolling
Internet hoaxes
People from Massachusetts
American comedy troupes